Rajit Punshi is an Indian businessman who works in the operational risk industry and was voted as one of the industry’s ‘Top 50 Faces in Operational Risk’ by Oprisk and Compliance magazine in 2008–09. He is the founder and managing principal at The Operational Risk Practice Pte. Ltd., Singapore.

Awards and accolades
 Industry Thought Leader on Operational Risk and voted as one of industry’s ‘Top 50 Faces in Operational Risk’ by Oprisk and Compliance Magazine in 2008–09
 Past Board member of Operational Risk Exchange (ORX). Currently their Asia representative

External speaking engagements

References

Living people
Businesspeople from Chandigarh
Year of birth missing (living people)